Polar Bear is a 2022 American nature documentary film about polar bears directed by Alastair Fothergill and Jeff Wilson. Narrated by Catherine Keener, it is the sixteenth nature documentary to be released under the Disneynature label. The film was released as a Disney+ exclusive on Earth Day April 22, 2022.

Plot
A mother polar bear and her cub swim across the waters that was once the ice of the Arctic Tundra, as the film tells us the story of how she and her family survived during her youth. She had loved playing with her twin brother as they were watched & protected by their mother, as she goes seal hunting & keeping a look out for male polar bears who threaten the cubs, they even came across a dead whale, and they, along with many other bears, feasted on it. Sadly one day, the polar bear’s brother died, and it was only her & her mom left, she successfully hunted a baby walrus abandoned by a panicked mother. The bear’s mother knew it's time to fend for herself again, and departs. The Polar Bear then spent years not seeing another ice bear, until she meets another male her age & they spend a day playing together, as he bids farewell, she realizes she was being tracked by a much bigger male. Thinking he was going to kill her, she stands her ground, but soon realizes she was being courted. As the big male & the female go their separate ways, The Polar Bear soon becomes a mother of one cub. In the present day, the mother and daughter spend their days surviving in the disappearing Arctic, the female knows her daughter will have what it takes to become a good ice bear, with a concerned question on what kind of world will she call home. The film ends with a message reading “the Arctic could be ice-free by the summer of 2040, the actions we take today can positively change the future of polar bears”.

Production
In January 2022, Disney announced that Catherine Keener would serve as the narrator of Disneynature's upcoming documentary about polar bears. Alastair Fothergill and Jeff Wilson, the directing duo of Disneynature's previous film Penguins, would direct the film for producers Keith Scholey, Roy Conli, and Jason Roberts. Harry Gregson-Williams composed the film's score.

Release
Polar Bear was released as a Disney+ exclusive on Earth Day April 22, 2022.

Reception

Critical response
On the review aggregator Rotten Tomatoes, the film holds an approval rating of 74%, based on 19 reviews, with an average rating of 5.8/10.

Claire Shaffer, of The New York Times, gave a positive review, saying "to its credit, Polar Bear isn't just playing in the snow; there's a very conscious through-line of conservation, highlighting how climate change has negatively affected the Arctic's ecosystem." John Serba of Decider found that the movie provides an effective scientific warning on climate change and its consequences, while claiming that the film manages to highlight the beauty of the world. Robin Holabird of KUNR claimed that the documentary succeeds to highlight climate change and how its impact on the ice cap can be lethal to polar bears, praised the team that worked behind the documentary for being unobtrusive while filming, and found Catherine Keener to be a thoughtful and serene narrator. Jennifer Green of Common Sense Media rated the movie 4 out of 5 stars, praised the film for its educational value, stating it focuses on the knowledge and skills of polar bears while highlighting the lethality of climate change, and found the movie to contain positive messages and role models, claiming it depicts the challenges encountered when trying to survive in the Arctic wild.

References

External links

2020s English-language films
2022 documentary films
Disney+ original films
Disneynature films
Documentary films about bears
Documentary films about the Arctic
Films about polar bears
Films directed by Alastair Fothergill
Films scored by Harry Gregson-Williams
2020s American films